The following is a list of Chinese films first released in 2011. There were 154 Chinese feature films released in China in 2011.

Highest-grossing films
These are the top 10 grossing Chinese films that were released in China in 2011:

2011

January – March

April – June

July – September

October – December

See also
2011 in China

References

External links
IMDb list of Chinese films

Lists of 2011 films by country or language
Films
2011